The following bridges and ferries cross the Saint John River in the Canadian province of New Brunswick and U.S. state of Maine.

Crossings

See also

References

Saint John River

Crossings
Crossings